Trzebin may refer to the following places:
Trzebin, Greater Poland Voivodeship (west-central Poland)
Trzebin, Myślibórz County in West Pomeranian Voivodeship (north-west Poland)
Trzebin, Wałcz County in West Pomeranian Voivodeship (north-west Poland)